Rødvig is a town and fishing harbour, with a population of 1,858 (1 January 2022), in Stevns Municipality, Region Zealand in Denmark.

The town is situated on the south east coast of Zealand just south of Stevns Klint.

The harbour

Rødvig Harbour is a combined marina and fishing harbour. It is the second largest active fishing harbour on Zealand.

Rødvig Flint oven stands at the harbour, as a landmark for Rødvig.
It is a 3.5 meter tall square building, with a 5 meter high chimney brick on top. The current  oven is a replica of a flint oven build in 1870 for production of flint floure used for fajance.

Attractions

Rødvig Shipmotor Museum, located at Havnevej 7, near the harbour, has s collection of approximately 400 different ship engines.

Rødvig Beach is a sandy beach stretching more than 1 kilometer west of the harbour.

Transportation

Rødvig is the terminal station on the Hårlev-Rødvig branch of the Østbanen railway line.

References

Cities and towns in Region Zealand
Stevns Municipality